Wanda Media, also known as Wanda Pictures, is a Chinese film production company and distributor. Wanda Media is a subsidiary of Wanda Group which is responsible for the development, investment, production, publicity, marketing, copyright operations, and other film and television related business. In 2014, the company was the largest Chinese private film production company and second-largest overall Chinese production company in China by market share, with 3.17%, and the fifth-largest film distributor, with 5.2% of the market.

Filmography
The following is a list of films produced and/or distributed by Wanda Media (also known as Wanda Pictures).

References

External links

Dalian Wanda Group
Film distributors of China
Film production companies of China